Jose Manuel Corrales Montalvan was a Filipino military officer who fought in Mindanao during World War II.

Early life
Montalvan was born on March 17, 1903, in Cagayan de Oro.

Career
Montalvan was part of the United States Army Reserve in 1928 as a commissioned first lieutenant and also underwent training with the U.S. Army Extension Courses. From 1933 to 1937, Montalvan taught at the Ateneo de Cagayan as an instructor in military science and tactics. He would resign from the U.S. Army Reserve to become a commissioned first lieutenant at the Philippine Army's Infantry Reserve on July 16, 1936. He would be called to active duty training at Camp Murphy Training School graduating in 1938.

He would be called to an extended tour of active duty. He was assigned as a cadre commander of the 2nd Misamis Oriental (Machine Gun) Cadre at Camp Bulua throughout 1939. He would become camp commander and mobilization officer in the same camp now renamed as Camp Edilberto Evangelista from January 1, 1940, until the onset of World War II. In 1940 he would graduate from the School of Military Law and Courts-Martial Procedures, Camp Keithley in Lanao.

Montalvan would become part of the United States Army Forces in the Far East (USAFFE) on September 6, 1941. He was appointed as division finance officer and division quartermaster of the USAFFE's 102nd Division.

World War II
During the Japanese occupation of the Philippines, Montalvan would be captured by Imperial Japanese forces following the surrender of the USAFFE in Mindanao led by William F. Sharp. He was detained at the Ateneo de Cagayan campus. He escaped to join the guerilla movement led by American Wendell Fertig.

Post-World War II and later life
Montalvan was placed in inactive status on July 11, 1946, due to polyneuritis. He was promoted to the major rank under the infantry reserve on January 20, 1950.

He went back to his duties as an instructor in Spanish at Ateneo in 1949. He would enter Ateneo's Cagayan Law School to pursue a career in law. He obtained his bachelor's degree in law in 1953 and passed the Bar examinations. He would be admitted to the Bar in June 1954 and became a practicing lawyer. Montalvan died on September 11, 1978.

Legacy
In 2011, there was a proposal to rename Camp Evangelista after Montalvan in recognition of contribution to the Philippines' pushback against to the Japanese during the World War II. The proposal's proponents believe that it is apt to rename the camp in honor of someone who is also a native of Cagayan de Oro.

Personal life
Montalvan was married to Mercedes Acero Roa with whom he had six children.

Awards
Montalvan received the following honors and recognitions:

Philippine Defense Medal
American Defense Medal
Asiatic–Pacific Campaign Medal
World War II Victory Medal
Philippine Republic Unit Citation Badge
US Distinguished Unit Badge

References

1903 births
1978 deaths
Philippine Army personnel of World War II
Filipino guerrillas
People from Cagayan de Oro
Ateneo de Davao University alumni
Filipino lawyers